Jaora is a city and a municipality in Ratlam district in the Indian state of Madhya Pradesh. Jaora is located in the Malwa region, between Ratlam and Mandsaur. It was the capital of the Jaora princely state of Jaora before Independence. During the Mourning of Muharram, thousands of people from all over the world visit the shrine of Hussain Tekri. Jains visit Jaora as a place that the Jain ascetic Rajendrasuri practiced tapasya.

Demographics
As of the 2011 India census, Jaora tehsil had a population of 243070. Males constitute 51% of the population and females 49%. Jaora has an average literacy rate of 62%, higher than the national average of 59.5%: male literacy is 70%, and female literacy is 54%. In Jaora, 16% of the population is under 6 years of age.

Jaora princely state

The state was founded by 'Abdu'l Ghafur Muhammad Khan, a Muslim of Afghan descent. He was a cavalry officer serving the Pindari leader Amir Khan. He later served the Holkar Maharaja of Indore, subduing Rajput territories in northern Malwa and annexing their lands. The expansion stopped after he was defeated by Raja Lakshman Singh of Sailana, who made him swear not to trouble the local Rajputs after the victory. The Nawab later swore allegiance to the British to save his newly found state. The Nawabs of Jaora were very loyal to the British and were responsible for destroying many Rebels during the mutiny period. In return for the services, The state was confirmed by the British government in 1818 by the Treaty of Mandsaur.

Places of interest

There are two city parks, Chota Baagh and Bada Baagh. The Hussain Tekri shrine on the edge of the town attracts thousands of visitors every year. Notable temples include 900+ year old Idol of Shree Lakshmikant Bhagwan in Shree Lakshmikant Mandir  (Brahmin Gali), Ambe mata Mandir , Jagnath Mahadev Mandir the 200-year-old Radhakrishna temple, Manchapuran Hanuman temple, Jagnath Mahadev, Bada Mandir (Jain Temple), and Jain Dadawadi (Shree Rajendrasurishwar ji maharasaheb), Rogyadevi mandir, Sujalpur mandir.

Educational institutes
As of the 2011 Census of India, Jaora had 119 primary schools, 38 middle schools, 9 secondary schools and 11 senior secondary schools as well as 2 science colleges and 1 polytechnic college.

Transport 

Jaora has a railway station on the Indian Railways network between Ratlam - Ajmer section. From Jaora there are direct trains for Ajmer, Chittorgarh, Udaipur, Agra, Kota, Indore, Bhopal, Jodhpur, Jaipur, Ujjain, Ratlam, Mandsaur, Neemuch, Mumbai, Vadodara, Ahmedabad.

The Mhow - Neemuch state highway passes through Jaora. Jaora is 38 km from district HQ Ratlam. Buses provide access to the surrounding area.

Nawabs of Jaora
 1817-1825 Iftikhar ud-Daula, Nawab Abdul Ghafur'Khan Bahadur, Diler-Jung
 1825-1827 Musharraf Begum (f)+ Jahangir Khan -Regent (d. 1827)
 1827-1840 Borthwick -Regent
 1825-1865 Muhtasim ud-Daula, Nawab Ghaus Muhammad'Khan Bahadur, Shaukat-Jung
 1865-1872 Sahibzada Hazrat Nur Khan-Regent
 1865-1895 Ihtisham ud-Daula, Nawab Muhammad Ismail'Khan Bahadur, Firoz-Jung
 1895-1906 Sahibzada Yar Muhammad Khan -Regent
 1895-1947 Fakhr ud-Daula, Nawab Iftikhar Ali'Khan Bahadur, Saulat-Jung
 1947-1972 Asif ud-Daula, Nawab Usman Ali'Khan Bahadur, Saulat-Jung. Unmarried

Notable people
 Kailash Nath Katju - former CM of Madhya Pradesh
 Laxminarayan Pandey - former Member of parliament Mandsour (Lok Sabha constituency)

References

External links 
 Jaora view from the sky
 Brief History of Jaora
 Jaora Pictures
 Jaora Flag

See also 
 Ratlam
 Malwa

Cities and towns in Ratlam district
Cities in Malwa